Mauritius competed at the 2022 Commonwealth Games at Birmingham, England from 28 July to 8 August 2022. It was the team's 16th appearance at the Games.

Unlike prior editions, Mauritius will have three flagbearers (the first team to have three flagbearers) during the opening ceremony. Boxer Merven Clair, judoka Priscilla Morand and para-athlete Noemi Alphonse will be the flagbearers.

Medalists

Competitors
The following is the list of number of competitors participating at the Games per sport/discipline.

Athletics

Men
Track and road events

Women
Track and road events

Field events

Badminton

As of 1 June 2022, Mauritius qualified for the mixed team event via the BWF World Rankings.

Singles

Doubles

Mixed team

Summary

Group stage

Boxing

Men

Cycling

A squad of eight cyclists was officially selected on 1 July 2022.

Road
Men

Women

Mountain bike

Judo

A squad of six judoka was entered as of 13 July 2022.

Men

Women

Swimming

A squad of four swimmers was officially selected on 21 May 2022.

Men

Women

Table tennis

Singles

Doubles

Team

Triathlon

Two triathletes were selected as of 23 April 2022.

Individual

Weightlifting

Three weightlifters initially qualified through their positions in the IWF Commonwealth Ranking List (as of 9 March 2022). By 30 March 2022, two additional weightlifters qualified by invitation or reallocation.

Men

Women

Wrestling

Repechage Format

References

External links
Mauritius Olympic Committee Official site

Nations at the 2022 Commonwealth Games
2022
2022 in Mauritian sport